William Hord Richardson (December 25, 1903 – December 28, 1969) was an American middle-distance runner. He competed in the men's 800 metres at the 1924 Summer Olympics.

References

External links
 

1903 births
1969 deaths
Athletes (track and field) at the 1924 Summer Olympics
American male middle-distance runners
Olympic track and field athletes of the United States
Place of birth missing